Hans-Alexandre Anapak-Baka (born 10 February 2001) is a German professional footballer who plays as a left winger.

References

2001 births
21st-century German people
Living people
German footballers
Sportspeople from Bonn
Footballers from North Rhine-Westphalia
Association football wingers
KFC Uerdingen 05 players
FC Schalke 04 II players
3. Liga players
Regionalliga players